Telangana Kalam is a registered Telugu language newspaper. It was launched on 12 February 2013.

References

External links
 Telangana Kalam Website

Daily newspapers published in India
Telugu-language newspapers
Newspapers published in Hyderabad
2013 establishments in Andhra Pradesh
Newspapers established in 2013